A post box (British English; also written postbox; also known as pillar box), also known as a collection box, mailbox, letter box or drop box (American English) is a physical box into which members of the public can deposit outgoing mail intended for collection by the agents of a country's postal service. The term post box can also refer to a private letter box for incoming mail.

History of post boxes

Europe

In 1653, the first post boxes are believed to have been installed in and around Paris. By 1829, post boxes were in use throughout France. The first public post boxes in Poland were installed in Warsaw in 1842.

A post box originally installed in the wall of the Wakefield Post Office is dated 1809 and believed to be the oldest example in Britain. It is now on display at the new Wakefield Museum.

In the British Isles, the first red pillar post boxes were erected in Guernsey in 1852. Roadside wall boxes first appeared in 1857 as a cheaper alternative to pillar boxes, especially in rural districts. In 1853 the first pillar box in the United Kingdom was installed at Botchergate, Carlisle.  In 1856, Richard Redgrave of the Department of Science and Art designed an ornate pillar box for use in London and other large cities. In 1859 the design was improved, and this became the first National Standard pillar box. Green was adopted as the standard colour for the early Victorian post boxes. Between 1866 and 1879 the hexagonal Penfold post box became the standard design for pillar boxes and it was during this period that red was first adopted as the standard colour. The first boxes to be painted red were in London in July 1874, although it would be nearly 10 years before all the boxes had been repainted. In 2012, to celebrate Olympic gold medals for Team GB, selected boxes were painted gold. One was defaced briefly by a vandal with graffiti. One has been painted in the 'wrong' town.
The first public letter boxes (post boxes) in Russia appeared in 1848 in St. Petersburg. They were made of wood and iron.

Asia
The post box arrived in the late 19th century Hong Kong and were made of wood. In the 1890s, metal pillar box appeared in Hong Kong and remained in use until the late 1990s. From the 1890s to 1997 the boxes were painted red and after 1997 were painted green.

North America
The United States Post Office Department began installing public mail collection boxes in the 1850s outside post offices and on street corners in large Eastern cities. American collection boxes were initially designed to be hung or supported, and were mounted on support pillars, lamp-posts, telegraph poles, or even the sides of buildings. By the 1880s, these pillar boxes were made of heavy cast iron to deter theft or vandalism. As mail volume grew, the Post Office Department gradually replaced pillar mailboxes with larger free-standing models, though many of the pillar boxes continued in service as late as the 1960s.

The four-footed, free-standing U.S. Mail collection box was first suggested in 1894, following the successful use of such designs in Canada, and quickly became a fixture on American city street corners.

Unlike Canadian mailboxes, which were painted red, American mail collection boxes were originally painted in red or green.  Beginning in 1909, all mail collection boxes were painted a dark green to avoid confusion with emergency and fire equipment.  Dark green gave way to olive drab green after World War I, when the United States Army donated a large supply of olive drab green paint to the Post Office.  Olive drab green subsequently became the standard colour for all American mail collection boxes until 1955.  On 4 July 1955, Postmaster General Arthur Summerfield announced that the Post Office would begin painting all mail collection boxes in red, white, and blue to make them easily identifiable.  Subsequently, the Post Office began painting mail collection boxes in red and blue, with white lettering. In 1971 the United States Postal Service changed mail collection boxes to the current USPS Dark Blue with contrasting lettering. The coming of the automobile also influenced American mailbox design, and in the late 1930s, an extension chute or "snorkel" to drive-up curbside collection boxes was adopted.

Africa
 In 1500, a Portuguese sea captain named Pêro de Ataíde lost much of his fleet in a storm off the Southern Cape. He wrote a message reporting the damage and a warning relating the state of affairs in India, for future Portuguese captains to avoid Calicut, which was now hostile. Ataíde tucked the message in a boot dangling from a milkwood tree near a spring where sailors often drew water, Aguada de São Brás (Mossel Bay).

Miraculously, the message was retrieved by its intended recipient, João da Nova, admiral of the outgoing 3rd armada, the very next year. The tree became a de facto post office box, where sailors would exchange letters protected in boots, iron pots, or beneath rocks. Seamen would leave their messages behind, trusting that their countrymen would pick them up and deliver them to their correct destination, albeit very slowly.

The Post Office Tree, now believed to be approximately 600 years old, still continues to send and receive mail. A large post office box shaped like a giant boot has been constructed beneath the tree, where people can send letters anywhere in the world and receive a special stamp. Presumably, delivery now takes less than a year.

Types of post boxes
Varieties of post boxes (for outgoing mail) include:

 Lamp box
 Pillar box
 Wall box
 Ludlow style wall box

Some postal operators have different types of post boxes for different types of mail, such as, ordinary post, air mail and express mail, for local addresses (defined by a range of postal codes) and out-of-town addresses, or for post bearing postage stamps and post bearing a postage meter indicator.

Some countries have different coloured post boxes; in countries such as Australia, Portugal, and Russia, the colour indicates which type of mail a box is to be used for, such as 1st and 2nd class post. However, in Germany and parts of Sweden, because of postal deregulation, the different colours are for the different postal services. Other nations use a particular colour to indicate common political or historical ties.

Post boxes or mailboxes located outdoors are designed to keep mail secure and protected from weather. Some boxes have a rounded or slanted top or a down turned entry slot to protect mail from rain or snow. Locks are fitted for security, so mail can be retrieved only by official postal employees, and the box will ordinarily be constructed so as to resist damage from vandalism, forcible entry, or other causes. Bright colours are often used to increase visibility and prevent accidents and injuries. Entry openings are designed to allow the free deposit of mail, yet prevent retrieval via the access slot by unauthorised persons.

Clearance 
Post boxes are emptied ("cleared") at times usually listed on a collection plate fixed to the box. In urban areas, this might be once or twice a day. Busy boxes might be cleared more frequently to avoid overflowing, and also to spread the work for the sorters. Extra clearances are made in the period leading up to Christmas, to prevent boxes becoming clogged with mail.

Since 2005, most Royal Mail post boxes have had the time of only the last collection of the day shown on the box, with no indication of whether the box is cleared at other times earlier in the day. Royal Mail say they needed to increase the type size of the wording on the plate to help those with poor sight, and so there was not enough room to list all collection times throughout the day. Some post boxes may indicate the next collection time by a metal 'tab' or dial that can be changed while the box is open. The tab displays a day or number, each number corresponding to a different time shown on the plate.

Some boxes have been used as a dumping ground for used hypodermic needles. In such cases staff are issued with protective equipment.

Terrorism and political vandalism

United Kingdom

Scotland
In 1952, a number of post boxes were attacked in Scotland in a dispute over the regnal number adopted by Queen Elizabeth II, which was displayed as the EIIR cypher. This included at least one damaged in Gilmerton Road, The Inch, Edinburgh by a homemade explosive device. This was because many Scottish people did not believe Queen Elizabeth II should take that title. Rather Elizabeth Queen of Scots as Scotland had never had a Queen Elizabeth before.

Following a civil case in the Scottish courts, a compromise was reached where the Crown of Scotland was placed upon Scottish pillar boxes in place of the St Edward's Crown, without any reference to the particular reigning monarch. To this day Scottish post boxes and Royal Mail vans use the Scottish Crown with no mention of Queen Elizabeth II.

The Troubles
During 1939 a number of bombs were put in post boxes by the IRA as part of their S-Plan campaign. When the Provisional IRA blew up the Arndale shopping centre in the 1996 Manchester bombing, one of the few things to survive unscathed was a Victorian pillar box dating from 1887 (a type A Jubilee pillar).

In Northern Ireland several red Royal Mail post boxes were painted green by Irish Republicans in early 2009, in order to resemble An Post's post boxes in the Republic of Ireland.

United States
Nearly 7,000 USPS collection boxes were removed following the aftermath of the September 11 attacks and the 2001 anthrax attacks in which letters containing anthrax spores were placed in public collection boxes.  Since that time, a decrease in first-class mail volume and the onset of online bill payment processing has resulted in lower demand for collection box service in the United States.

Colours 

Red Argentina, Australia, Bahamas, Barbados, Belgium, Canada, Denmark (Post Danmark), Gibraltar, Greece (express post), Greenland, Hungary, Iceland, India, Isle of Man, Israel, Italy (domestic post), South Korea, Japan, Jersey, Macau, Malaysia, Malta, Mauritius, Mexico, Monaco, Netherlands – surviving heritage and PTT boxes, New Zealand, Norway (national and international mail), Pakistan, Poland, Portugal, Romania, Spain (express mail), South Africa, Sri Lanka, Taiwan (airmail and prompt delivery), Thailand, Uganda (Posta Uganda), United Kingdom
Yellow Algeria, Australia (Express Post), Austria, Bosnia-Herzegovina, Brazil, Bulgaria, Croatia, Cyprus (red before 1960), D.R.Congo (scpt), Finland (2nd class), France, Germany (Deutsche Post), Greece (regular & international mail), Iran, Lithuania, Malaysia (Express Post), Montenegro, Morocco, Norway (local mail), Russia (1st Class), Rwanda (iposita), Serbia, Slovakia, Slovenia, Spain (regular mail), Sweden (national and international mail), Switzerland (& Liechtenstein), Tunisia, Turkey, Ukraine, Vatican City, Vietnam
Blue Belarus, Finland (1st class), Faroe Islands, Germany (many private postal companies), Guernsey, Alderney, Dominican Republic, Sark, Italy (Air Mail only), United Kingdom (Air Mail – 1933–1940), Portugal (1st Class (Blue Mail) only), Sweden (local mail), Russia, United States
Green China, Hong Kong (red before 1997), Taiwan (regular mail), Sudan (SudaPost), Republic of Ireland (red before 1922), Some heritage boxes in the United Kingdom, notably Stoke on Trent, Rochester & Scunthorpe
Orange Czech Republic, Estonia, Indonesia, Netherlands (TNT N.V./PostNL (red before 2006))
White San Marino, Singapore
Gray Philippines
Gold United Kingdom (only for 2012 Summer Olympics and Paralympics gold medal winners) 
Black United Kingdom (only for 2020 Black History Month)

Symbols 

 Australia – a styled red letter "P" on a white circle, "P" standing for "Post".
 Canada – a combination of a bird wing and an aircraft wing in a red circle and flanked by the words Canada Post / Postes Canada. Previously the words Canada, Canada Post, or Canada Post Corporation) were used on post boxes. Until the early 1970s, post boxes had the words "Royal Mail" and the Royal Coat of Arms of Canada.
 Continental Europe – most designs include a Post horn, like those used by postmen to announce their arrival. In Germany the post horn is the only element indicating post services.
 France – the arrow-shaped logo of La Poste.
 Greece – Hellenic Post use the head of god Hermes wearing a winged petasos (summer hat) as their logo. Hermes was usually portrayed as the messenger of the gods
 Netherlands – an orange triangle with "postnl" and a royal crown in it.
Republic of Ireland – from 1922 the Irish harp entwined with the letters "SE" for Saorstát Éireann, then "P⁊T" Gaelic script for Post and Telegraphs and from 1984 An Post with their wavy lines logo, often on the door as a raised casting.
 Portugal - logo of the CTT Correios, consisting of a mounted postman playing a post horn.
 Russia – logo of Russian Post (Почта России) written white on blue and black on yellow 1st class mail boxes.
 Spain – Post horn and a royal crown over it.
 Japan – a "T" with bar above it (〒).
 United Kingdom – all post boxes display the Royal Cypher of the reigning monarch at the time of manufacture. Exceptions are the Anonymous pillar boxes of 1879–1887, where the cypher was omitted, and all boxes for use in Scotland manufactured after 1952 (including replicas of the 1866 Penfold design) which show the Crown of Scotland instead of the Royal Cypher for Elizabeth II.  Private boxes emptied by Royal Mail do not have to carry a cypher. Royal Mail post boxes manufactured since 1994 carry the wording "Royal Mail", normally above the aperture (lamp boxes) or on the door (pillar boxes). Before this date all post boxes, with the exception of the Anonymous pillar boxes, carried the wording "Post Office".
 United States – the United States Postal Service (USPS) eagle logo, except that boxes for Express Mail use the USPS Express Mail logo.

Gallery

See also 
General Post Office
Packstation
Post-office box, used for incoming mail
Stamp vending machine, often attached to post boxes
2012 Olympics gold post boxes in the United Kingdom

References and sources

Notes

Sources

External links

Letter Box Study Group
Post Boxes of Oxford
British Postal Museum & Archive
Colne Valley Postal History Museum

Containers
Postal infrastructure
Street furniture